OTIF may refer to:

Intergovernmental Organisation for International Carriage by Rail
On Time In Full , a logistics performance measurement which indicates how many deliveries are supplied on time without any article missing